The 147th Anti-Aircraft Missile Regiment (147 zrp) (Military Unit Number 96869) is a surface-to-air missile regiment of the Belarusian Air and Air Defense Forces. Stationed at Babruysk, the regiment is equipped with the Osa-AKM short-range, low altitude surface to air missile system to provide air defense for the local air base. Before being reduced to a regiment in 2017, it was the 147th Anti-Aircraft Missile Brigade.

History 
The history of the regiment began with the completion of the formation of the 110th Army Anti-Aircraft Artillery Brigade of the Soviet Army in Belorussian Military District on 1 April 1949, celebrated as the unit anniversary. The brigade was formed in five months from personnel of the 5th Guards Mechanized Army and officers of the Belorussian Military District, under the command of Colonel Ivan Dmitryevich Zinoviev. It was based near the Babruysk fortress in the historical center of Babruysk, where it remains to this day. The unit was first equipped with medium caliber anti-aircraft guns and was the air defense brigade of the 5th Guards Mechanized Army, which became the 5th Guards Tank Army. It was reorganized as the 58th Anti-Aircraft Artillery Division on 11 November 1955. The unit received its battle flag on 11 April 1959 from the army commander, and on 1 August 1960 became the 160th Anti-Aircraft Artillery Regiment (Medium Caliber). Transitioning to the surface-to-air missile (SAM) era, the regiment received the S-75 Dvina system in 1962 and was accordingly redesignated the 160th Separate Anti-Aircraft Missile Regiment in 1963.

The regiment was declared an exemplary regiment in 1967 by the army commander for receiving high marks in the readiness check that fall, and regimental commander Colonel Suleyman Asadullayev was awarded the Order of the Red Banner. The 160th was reorganized as the 147th Anti-Aircraft Missile Brigade on 8 June 1972, transitioning to the Krug-M missile system. For distinguishing itself in combat training, the regiment was awarded the transferable Red Banner of the Belorussian Military District. The brigade was re-equipped with the S-300V SAM system between 1988 and 1990, the third Soviet unit to receive the new weaponry and the first to go on combat alert with it. By this point it was directly under district control as a frontal air defense brigade. The brigade participated in the Dvina, Vesna-75, Elektron-5, Berezina, Belarus, Zapad-81, Granit-82, and Boevoye sodruzhestvo-2000 (Combat Brotherhood) exercises.

The brigade became part of the Northwestern Operational Tactical Air Force Command on 31 January 2011. The brigade was rearmed with the Osa-AKM SAM system in 2016, and reorganized as the 147th Anti-Aircraft Missile Regiment on 1 December 2017. As of 2017 it was commanded by Colonel Aleksandr Galaktionov. The regiment frequently participates in tactical exercises to test its combat readiness held at the 174th Training Ground of the Air and Air Defense Forces.  It is tasked with providing air defense for the Babruysk air base.

The regiment participated in the Zapad 2021 exercise under the command of Lieutenant Colonel Igor Kruglik, practicing target tracking with Russian aircraft at the 174th Training Ground.

References

Citations

Bibliography

External links 
 Holm page on 147th Anti-Aircraft Missile Regiment; some information does not match

Military units and formations of Belarus
Air defence regiments
Military units and formations established in 2017